Davide Villella (born 27 June 1991) is an Italian former professional road racing cyclist, who competed as a professional from 2014 to 2022.

Biography
Born on 27 June 1991, in Magenta, Lombardy, Villella resides in Sant'Omobono Terme, Lombardy, Italy.

He started the 2014 Giro d'Italia, but withdrew on Stage 6. He was named in the start list for the 2015 Vuelta a España.

Major results

2012
 2nd Piccolo Giro di Lombardia
 3rd Gran Premio della Liberazione
 3rd Trofeo Alcide Degasperi
 6th Trofeo Edil C
 7th Ruota d'Oro
 8th Overall Giro della Regione Friuli Venezia Giulia
1st Points classification
1st Stages 4 & 5
 9th Trofeo Franco Balestra
2013
 1st  Overall Giro della Valle d'Aosta
1st  Points classification
1st Stages 2 & 4
 1st Piccolo Giro di Lombardia
 2nd Road race, National Under-23 Road Championships
 2nd Trofeo Edil C
 2nd Gran Premio di Poggiana
 3rd Coppa Sabatini
 3rd Giro dell'Emilia
 4th Gran Premio Palio del Recioto
 6th Road race, UCI Under-23 Road World Championships
 6th Giro del Belvedere
 8th Coppa della Pace
 10th Road race, UEC European Under-23 Road Championships
2014
 1st  Mountains classification, Tour of the Basque Country
 4th Overall Arctic Race of Norway
1st  Young rider classification
 6th Coppa Sabatini
 6th Trofeo Laigueglia
2015
 10th Milano–Torino
2016
 1st Japan Cup
 5th Giro di Lombardia
 9th Giro dell'Emilia
 10th Overall Critérium International
 10th Overall Tour de Pologne
2017
 1st  Mountains classification, Vuelta a España
 5th Tre Valli Varesine
2018
 1st  Overall Tour of Almaty
1st  Points classification
1st Stage 1
2019
 2nd Overall CRO Race
 5th GP Industria & Artigianato di Larciano
 7th Gran Piemonte
 9th Overall Tour of Guangxi
2020
 3rd Pollença–Andratx
2021
 4th Trofeo Matteotti
 5th Overall Settimana Ciclistica Italiana
 5th Giro della Toscana
 7th Memorial Marco Pantani

Grand Tour general classification results timeline

References

External links

Cycling Base: Davide Villella
Cannondale-Garmin: Davide Villella 

1991 births
Living people
People from Magenta, Lombardy
Italian male cyclists
Cyclists from the Metropolitan City of Milan